Fra Mauro may refer to:

 Fra Mauro (crater), a crater on the Moon
 Fra Mauro formation, landing site of Apollo 14, named after Fra Mauro crater
 Fra Mauro, the 15th-century Venetian cartographer

See also
 Fra Mauro map, a map made around 1450 by the cartographer, showing the Old World